Mirjana is a Slavic feminine given name meaning  ′mir′ ("peace, world, prestige, area, space"). The name is widespread throughout Slovenia, Croatia, Bosnia and Herzegovina, Montenegro and Serbia.

Mirjana is possibly a form of Miriam and Maria.

List of people with the given name Mirjana  

Mirjana Bohanec (born 1939), Croatian opera singer and actress
Mirjana Boševska (born 1981), retired female freestyle and medley swimmer from Macedonia
Mirjana Božović (born 1987), beauty queen who represented Serbia in Miss World 2007
Mirjana Đurica (born 1961), former Yugoslav/Serbian handball player
Mirjana Gross (1922–2012), Croatian historian
Mirjana Isaković (born 1936), Serbian sculptor
Mirjana Joković (born 1967), Serbian actress
Mirjana Karanović (born 1957), Serbian actress
Mirjana Kostić (born 1983), Serbian singer
Mirjana Lučić (born 1982), professional tennis player from Croatia
Mirjana Marić (born 1970), American-born Serbian chess player
Mirjana Marković (born 1942), Serbian politician, widow of former Yugoslav president Slobodan Milošević
Mirjana Milenković (born 1985), Montenegrin handball player
Mirjana Ognjenović (born 1953), former Yugoslav/Croatian handball player
Mirjana Puhar (1995–2015), America's Next Top Model contestant
Ana Mirjana Račanović, Serbian pageant model who was Miss Bosnia and Herzegovina in 2001
Mirjana Živković (born 1935), Serbian musicologist and professor

See also

References

Bosnian feminine given names
Croatian feminine given names
Montenegrin feminine given names
Serbian feminine given names
Slovene feminine given names